Glacier Peak is a  mountain summit located in Union County, Oregon, US.

Description

Glacier Peak is located at the center of the Wallowa Mountains and is set within the Eagle Cap Wilderness, on land managed by Wallowa–Whitman National Forest. The peak is situated 2.6 miles northwest of Cusick Mountain, 0.5 mile southwest of Glacier Lake and 0.7 mile southeast of line parent Eagle Cap. Precipitation runoff from the mountain drains east into headwaters of the West Fork Wallowa River, and west into the East Fork Eagle Creek. On the north slope, a permanent snowfield called Benson Glacier is a relict of the Wallowa Glacier which carved the canyon of West Fork Wallowa River for almost 20 miles during the late Pleistocene. The peak is composed of granodiorite of the Wallowa Batholith. This landform's toponym has not been officially adopted by the United States Board on Geographic Names, so it is not labelled on USGS maps, and will remain unofficial as long as the USGS policy of not adopting new toponyms in designated wilderness areas remains in effect.

Climate

Based on the Köppen climate classification, Glacier Peak is located in a subarctic climate zone characterized by long, usually very cold winters, and mild summers. Winter temperatures can drop below −10 °F with wind chill factors below −20 °F. Most precipitation in the area is caused by orographic lift. Thunderstorms are common in the summer.

See also
 List of mountain peaks of Oregon

Gallery

References

External links

 Glacier Peak (photo): Flickr

Mountains of Oregon
Landforms of Union County, Oregon
North American 2000 m summits
Wallowa–Whitman National Forest